My Darling Slave ("The [female] slave, I have her and you don't", also known as The Slave) is a 1973 Italian comedy film directed by Giorgio Capitani. It stars Lando Buzzanca, Catherine Spaak, and Adriana Asti.

Plot
Demetrio Cultrera (Lando Buzzanca), is a young, rich car dealership Sicilian bachelor who becomes engaged to the beautiful (and also rich) Rosalba Giordano (Catherine Spaak), daughter of a local business owner Giordano Tuna Company .

After their wedding, Rosalba's attitude changes when she decides to try turning Demetrio into the modern husband she would like.

This causes a problem, as Demetrius prefers sticking to what he sees as more traditional gender roles.  Despite her attempts, Rosalba's persistent attempts to convert him to the rituals of high society, enlightened, or feminine tastes do little more than annoy him.

Strongly determined to build a stable relationship with a woman who can fulfill his visions of peaceful married life, he leaves for the Amazon, where he is offered the opportunity to choose and buy a new wife as a slave. The choice falls on the beautiful and docile Manua (Veronica Merin) that he trains to act the way he would like, then proudly shows to friends and to his former wife, attracting curiosity, envy, and his ex-wife's resentment.

Cast
 Lando Buzzanca as Demetrio Cultrera car dealership
 Catherine Spaak as Rosalba Giordano of Giordano tuna enterprise
 Adriana Asti as Elena
 Veronica Merin as Manua, the slave
 Gordon Mitchell as Von Thirac
 Gianni Bonagura as Balzarini
 Paolo Carlini as Manlio
 Renzo Marignano as Corrado
 Corrado Olmi as A passenger leather merchant
 Filippo De Gara as A passenger
 Tom Felleghy as Hotel concierge
 Maria Tedeschi as old passenger
 Mauro Vestri as priest
 Empedocle Buzzanca as mafia boss Don Vincenzo
 Alfonso Giganti as train passenger
 Giuseppe Marrocco as deputy Tacconis
 Empedocle Buzzanca as Mafia's boss

References

External links 
 
 
 
 Review at ReelBad

1973 films
1970s Italian-language films
1970s sex comedy films
Commedia sexy all'italiana
Films scored by Piero Umiliani
1973 comedy films
1970s Italian films